Kazimierówka  is a village in the administrative district of Gmina Żmudź, within Chełm County, Lublin Voivodeship, in eastern Poland.

Notes

Villages in Chełm County